Cunk on Britain is a British mockumentary television series created by Charlie Brooker starring Diane Morgan as the title character. It premiered on the BBC on April 3, 2018, and concluded on May 1, 2018, after one season and five episodes. The series stars Morgan as Philomena Cunk, an ill-informed investigative reporter, a character which originated on Charlie Brooker's Weekly Wipe. It was followed up in 2022 by a similar series, Cunk on Earth.

Plot
Philomena Cunk, an ill-informed investigative reporter, retells British history through a series of montages and interviews with experts which feature odd or ridiculous questions.

Episodes

Cast and characters

Main
 Diane Morgan as Philomena Cunk

Reception
The Guardians Rebecca Nicholson notes, "It’s Cunk’s interviewing style that is the highlight and potentially one of its weaknesses. Chucking questions that make no sense at experts was a success on Screenwipe, and it works particularly well with British history academics, whose politeness and patience only exacerbates the absurdity." New Statesmans Anna Leszkiewicz states, "The success of Cunk as a character is not thanks to her general persona as an ill-informed pundit, but her bizarre turns of phrase."

2016 British television series debuts
2018 British television series endings
BBC television comedy

References